Diving at the 2019 World Aquatics Championships was held from 12 to 20 July 2019.

Events
The following events were contested:

1 m springboard
3 m springboard
10 m platform
3 m springboard synchronized
10 m platform synchronized
3 m springboard mixed synchronized
10 m platform mixed synchronized
Team event

Individual events consisted of preliminaries, semifinals and finals. The order of divers in the preliminary round was determined by computerized random selection, during the technical meeting. The 18 divers with the highest scores in the preliminaries proceed to the semifinals.

The semifinal consisted of the top 18 ranked divers from the preliminary competition and the final consisted of the top 12 ranked divers from the semifinal.

Schedule
13 events were held.

All time are local (UTC+9).

Medal summary

Medal table

Men

Women

Mixed

References

External links
Official website 

 
Diving
Diving at the World Aquatics Championships
World Aquatics Championships
Diving competitions in South Korea